General Irwin may refer to:

Alexander Irwin (died 1752), British Army lieutenant general
Alistair Irwin (born 1948), British Army lieutenant general
George LeRoy Irwin (1868–1931), U.S. Army major general
James Murray Irwin (1858–1938), British Army major general
John Irwin (British Army officer) (1727/28–1788), British Army general
Noel Irwin (1892–1972), British Army lieutenant general
Stafford LeRoy Irwin (1893–1955), U.S. Army lieutenant general

See also
James Brailsford Erwin (1856–1924), U.S. Army brigadier general